Luo River may refer to:

Luo River (Henan) (洛河, Luòhé), a tributary of the Yellow River, flows mostly in Henan province of China
Luo River (Shaanxi) (洛河, Luòhé), also known as the North Luo Rive (北洛河, Běi Luòhé), a river in Shaanxi province of China and the second largest tributary of the Wei River, which is the longest tributary of the Yellow River. 
Luo River (Guangdong) (螺河, Luohe), river in Guangdong, China; flows into South China Sea 
Luo River (Fujian) (洛江, Luojiang), river in Fujian, China; flows into Quanzhou Bay of Taiwan Strait

See also
Lô River, river in Vietnam
 Luo (disambiguation)